

England

Head coach: Geoff Cooke

 Paul Ackford
 Rob Andrew
 Mark Bailey
 Will Carling (c.)
 Wade Dooley
 David Egerton
 Jerry Guscott
 Simon Halliday
 Richard Hill
 Simon Hodgkinson
 Brian Moore
 Jeff Probyn
 Paul Rendall
 Mickey Skinner
 Mike Teague
 Rory Underwood
 Peter Winterbottom

France

Head coach: Jacques Fouroux

 Marc Andrieu
 Louis Armary
 Pierre Berbizier (c.)
 Philippe Bérot
 Serge Blanco
 Gilles Bourguignon
 Didier Camberabero
 Alain Carminati
 Marc Cécillon
 Éric Champ
 Denis Charvet
 Jean Condom
 Thierry Devergie
 Philippe Dintrans
 Dominique Erbani
 Jean-Pierre Garuet-Lempirou
 Jean-Baptiste Lafond
 Patrice Lagisquet
 Philippe Marocco
 Franck Mesnel
 Pascal Ondarts
 Claude Portolan
 Laurent Rodriguez
 Olivier Roumat
 Philippe Sella

Ireland

Head coach: Jim Davidson

 Fergus Aherne
 Willie Anderson
 Tom Clancy
 Keith Crossan
 Phil Danaher
 Paul Dean
 Fergus Dunlea
 Paul Haycock
 David Irwin
 Michael Kiernan
 Donal Lenihan
 Noel Mannion
 Phillip Matthews (c.)
 Denis McBride
 James Joseph McCoy
 Brendan Mullin
 Pat O'Hara
 John Sexton
 Steve Smith
 Brian Spillane

Scotland

Head coach: Jim Telfer

 Gary Armstrong
 Paul Burnell
 Finlay Calder (c.)
 Craig Chalmers
 Damian Cronin
 Peter Dods
 Matt Duncan
 Chris Gray
 Scott Hastings
 John Jeffrey
 Sean Lineen
 Iain Milne
 Kenny Milne
 Keith Robertson
 David Sole
 Iwan Tukalo
 Derek White

Wales

Head coach: John Ryan

 Bleddyn Bowen
 David Bryant
 Carwyn Davies
 Nigel Davies
 Phil Davies
 Laurance Delaney
 John Devereux
 David Evans
 Ieuan Evans
 Jonathan Griffiths
 Mike Griffiths
 Mike Hall
 Gary Jones
 Mark Jones
 Robert Jones
 Kevin Moseley
 Bob Norster
 Rowland Phillips
 Paul Turner
 Paul Thorburn (c.)
 Ian Watkins
 Hugh Williams-Jones
 Dai Young

Six Nations Championship squads